Calamity Jane (1852–1903), was an American frontierswoman.

Calamity Jane may also refer to:

Arts, entertainment and media

Music
 Calamity Jane (1990s band), an all-female American grunge/punk band
 Calamity Jane (album), a 10" LP album of songs sung by Doris Day and Howard Keel from the movie of the same name
 Calamity Jane (band), an American, all-female country music band
 "Calamity Jane", a song by French pop singer and actress Camélia Jordana

Other uses in arts, entertainment and media
  Calamity Jane (film), a 1953 American Technicolor western musical film
 Calamity Jane (Lucky Luke), a Lucky Luke comic written by Goscinny and illustrated by Morris
 Calamity Jane (musical), a stage musical based on the historical frontierswoman Calamity Jane
 The Legend of Calamity Jane, an American/French animated television series produced by Canal+ and France 3

Other uses
 Calamity Jane, a support vessel owned by the Swiss-based offshore contractor Allseas